Emery Worldwide Airlines was a cargo airline, once one of the leading carriers in the cargo airline world. Its headquarters were located in Redwood City, California.

History
Emery started in 1946 and was the first freight forwarder to receive a carrier certificate from the United States Government. For 40 years, Emery was the largest freight forwarder/integrated air carrier in the US. In 1979, Emery expanded its freight-forwarding facility near Kennedy International Airport on a 5.5 acre site leased to it by the NYC Public Development Corporation with the grant of a 10-year partial abatement of real estate taxes authorized by the City’s Industrial and Commercial Incentive Board.

In 1987, Wilton, CT-based Emery acquired Purolator Courier, Inc., a leading provider of logistics services between the U.S. and Canada. 

In 1988, Towers Financial Corporation, led by its CEO Steven Hoffenberg and his consultant Jeffrey Epstein, unsuccessfully tried to take over Emery in a corporate raid with Towers Financial as their raiding vessel. Their bid failed.

In 1989, Emery was acquired by Consolidated Freightways which gained U.S. rights to the Purolator name. In 2011 Purolator was renamed Purolator International.

Emery had its planes grounded on August 13, 2001, due to poor aircraft fleet maintenance. It officially ceased operating on December 5, 2001. All of Emery's cargo operations were subcontracted to other airlines.

Emery's successor company, Menlo Worldwide Forwarding, was acquired by UPS at the end of 2004.

At the time of their closing, Emery used Boeing 727, and Douglas DC-8 and DC-10 aircraft to transport freight.

At the end of 2020, UPS was using the name Emery Worldwide to market the air freight portion of UPS Supply Chain Solutions.

Fleet

Emery Worldwide Airlines had in the past operated the following aircraft:

Accidents and incidents
March 28, 1977: A Douglas C-47A (registered N57131) was destroyed by fire following a taxiing accident at O'Hare International Airport outside Chicago. The aircraft was due to operate a cargo flight.

July 8, 1988: A defamation suit was filed after a package was opened in transit in Los Angeles that included a video tape containing cash allegedly for an NCAA basketball recruit (Chris Mills) for the University of Kentucky. The package was identified as being sent by then-assistant coach Dwane Casey, who sued Emery for $6.9 million, but settled out of court before trial.

May 3, 1991: A Boeing 727 crew had to abort mid-takeoff roll at Bradley International Airport in Connecticut when an engine compressor disk came loose destroying the engine nacelle and severing oil, hydraulic, and fuel lines. The resulting fire consumed the plane and cargo. 3 crew members were on board. No fatalities.

December 9, 1996: A Douglas C-47A (registered N75142) crashed on an emergency return approach to Boise Airport in Idaho, killing both crew. Contracted by Desert Air, it was on a cargo flight to its base in Salt Lake City when the starboard engine caught fire shortly after take-off and the decision was made to return to Boise.

February 16, 2000: Flight 17, a Douglas DC-8-71F (registered N8079U) crashed on take-off on a scheduled cargo flight from Sacramento Mather Airport in California with three crew members aboard. Bound for Dayton, Ohio, the aircraft was destroyed by impact forces and post-crash fire; there were no survivors. The accident was caused by improper maintenance.

April 26, 2001: A Douglas DC-8-71F (registered N8076U) landed with a left main landing gear up at Nashville International Airport in Tennessee. The aircraft sustained minor damage and the three-member crew was not injured. Post-accident investigation found improper maintenance to the left main landing gear was at fault.

See also
 List of defunct airlines of the United States

Notes

External links

 Emery Worldwide Freight Services at UPS Supply Chain Solutions
 Emery Worldwide (Archive)
 1983 Emery Worldwide Commercial

Defunct cargo airlines
Defunct airlines of the United States
Airlines established in 1946
Airlines disestablished in 2001
Companies based in Redwood City, California
1946 establishments in California
2001 disestablishments in California
Cargo airlines of the United States
Airlines based in California